Levi Psavkin (also "Levy"; לוי פסבקין; born April 12, 1939) is an Israeli former Olympic runner. He was the Israeli Champion in the 100 metres (1964 and 1967), and in the 200 metres (1964).

He is Jewish, and his entire family was killed in the Holocaust.

Running career
His personal best in the 100 metres was 10.6, in 1963.

He won the Israeli Championship in the 100 metres in both 1964 and 1967, and in the 200 metres in 1964.

He competed for Israel at the 1964 Summer Olympics in Tokyo, Japan, at the age of 25 in Athletics. In the Men's 100 metres he came in 7th in Heat 5, with a time of 11.1. He placed 64th out of 72 runners.

Running administration
He was Chief of the Israeli delegation at the 2002 European Track and Field Championships.  He has been a member of the European Athletic Association's Development Committee, and the Veterans Committee of the International Association of Athletics Federation.

He is now the Secretary of the Israeli Athletic Association, in Tel Aviv, Israel.

References 

Living people
Athletes (track and field) at the 1964 Summer Olympics
1939 births
Olympic athletes of Israel
Israeli male sprinters
Jewish male athletes (track and field)